Hochheta Ki? or Hochchheta ki? is a 2008 Bengali comedy drama film directed by Basu Chatterjee. Chatterjee, director of Chhoti Si Baat, Baaton Baaton Mein and Khatta Meetha, tried to create a film in the style of David Dhawan.

Plot
Hochheta Ki is the story of a medical representative (chhaposha Bangalibabu) who falls in love with another woman four years into his marriage. That may not be a problem; the problem is the way he looks into the camera and starts telling the story of his life.  The two girls are Gharwali (Paoli Dam) and Baharwali (Arunima Ghosh).

Cast
Prasenjit Chatterjee as Modhu
Rajatava Dutta as Ranjit
Paran Bandopadhyay as Mr. Chakravarty
Ramaprasad Banik as Mr Das
Paoli Dam as Priya
Arunima Ghosh as Juhia

References

External links
 gomolo.in
 

2008 films
Bengali-language Indian films
2000s Bengali-language films
2008 romantic comedy films
Films directed by Basu Chatterjee
Indian romantic comedy films